John Stevenson (August 12, 1812 – April 1, 1884) was the first Speaker of the Legislative Assembly of Ontario from 1867 to 1871 and served as Conservative MPP for Lennox from 1867 to 1871.

Born in Hunterdon County, New Jersey, Stevenson's family moved to New York State (likely to the Albany, New York area and finally to Upper Canada. He was educated in Brockville and taught school briefly. Stevenson worked in various trades before entering politics:

 flour mill operator
 foundry owner
 axe shopkeeper
 brush factory owner
 lumberman
 shipping company owner

In 1842, he married Phoebe Eliza Hall.

Stevenson also served as a justice of the peace and as reeve for Napanee. From 1863 to 1865, he was warden for Lennox and Addington County.

After his defeat in 1871 by John Thomas Grange, he ran for the Lennox seat in the Canadian House of Commons in 1872 as an independent, losing to Richard John Cartwright, formerly a Conservative, now a Liberal. In 1878, he campaigned on behalf of Cartwright. Stevenson died in Napanee, Ontario in 1884.

References

External links
 

1812 births
1884 deaths
American emigrants to pre-Confederation Ontario
Canadian people of English descent
Immigrants to Upper Canada
People from Brockville
Progressive Conservative Party of Ontario MPPs
Speakers of the Legislative Assembly of Ontario
Canadian justices of the peace